Pati may refer to:

Locations 
 Pati, Barwani, in India
 Pati Regency, Indonesia
 Pati River, in Brazil

People 
 Amitai Pati, New Zealand opera singer
 Martha Isabel Ruiz Corzo (born 1953), Mexican environmentalist nicknamed "Pati"
 Pene Pati, New Zealand opera singer

Other 
 Pati (title), an honorific
 Shital pati, a kind of mat used on beds or floors

See also 
 Patti (disambiguation)
 Patricia, a given name